Hucknall St John's F.C. was an English association football club which participated in the FA Cup.  In the 1897–98 FA Cup, they reached the first round when they were beaten 2-0 by Liverpool.

References

Defunct football clubs in Nottinghamshire
Association football clubs established in the 19th century